Long Beach Municipal Cemetery, is a cemetery established as early as 1901 and located at the northwest corner of Willow Street and Orange Avenue in Signal Hill, California. It is located next door, and east of Sunnyside Cemetery. It was formerly known as Long Beach Signal Hill Cemetery, and also known as Long Beach Cemetery. 

Many of the early pioneer families of the city are buried here. Burials include the first Long Beach city health official, W.L. Cuthbert; and the founder of Willmore City, William Erwin Willmore.

See also 
 List of cemeteries in California

References 

Cemeteries in Los Angeles County, California
1901 establishments in California
Signal Hill, California
Cemeteries established in the 1900s